The Adirondack Railroad (formerly the Adirondack Scenic Railroad)  is a tourist railway serving the Adirondack Park, which plans to operate over trackage of the former New York Central Railroad between Utica and Tupper Lake. The railroad is operated by the not-for-profit Adirondack Railroad Preservation Society, with train crews composed largely of volunteers.

ADIX operates between Utica and Remsen over trackage of the Mohawk, Adirondack and Northern Railroad, part of the Genesee Valley Transportation Company. The Remsen–Tupper Lake segment is owned by the State of New York and is designated as a multi-use corridor for rail traffic during the spring, summer, and fall seasons, and as a snowmobile trail during the winter months.

As of 2021, passenger trains operated between Utica and Thendara, with a few trains continuing north to Big Moose. Historic stations have been restored in Holland Patent, Remsen, Saranac Lake and Lake Placid. The section of track between Utica and Lyons Falls is used for freight traffic operated by the Mohawk, Adirondack and Northern Railroad (MA&N).

History
The line was built in 1892 by Dr. William Seward Webb, a Vanderbilt in-law, as the Mohawk & Malone Railway and was later purchased from him by the New York Central Railroad. The New York Central ran passenger trains on the route until April 24, 1965.  It passed to the Penn Central Transportation Company on February 1, 1968, which abandoned freight operations north of Remsen in 1972. New York State bought the entire Utica-Lake Placid line from the bankrupt Penn Central in 1974, primarily to serve the 1980 Winter Olympics in Lake Placid. The Adirondack Railway then operated passenger services between Utica and Lake Placid from 1979 to 1981. Tracks were dormant from 1981 until 1992, when restoration began with a  section from Thendara to Minnehaha, New York. The section was approved and demonstrated on July 4, 1992, and the line was given the name Adirondack Centennial Railroad. It was renamed Adirondack Scenic Railroad in 1994.

The railroad had formerly planned to restore passenger operations over the entire Utica–Lake Placid corridor ( in length), and did operate from 2000 to 2016 on the short, isolated segment between Saranac Lake and Lake Placid. While this vision was supported by several local communities (most notably Tupper Lake and the Next Stop Tupper Lake organization), opponents called for replacing the Tupper Lake–Lake Placid section with a rail trail. Trackage was slated to be dismantled in late 2016, but was delayed pending resolution of a protracted legal battle. The New York Supreme Court ultimately sided with the railroad on September 26, 2017, annulling the rail trail plan in its entirety. However, the Adirondack Park Agency was successful in redefining the term "travel corridor" in the Adirondack Park Act in 2020. As a result, tracks were removed beginning in October 2020 to create a rail-trail along the  segment from Tupper Lake to Lake Placid: now planned for completion by 2024. Simultaneously, New York State has renovated the tracks from Big Moose to Tupper Lake.  The first train ran over the entire  Utica–Tupper Lake corridor in September 2022, with regular scheduled tourist excursion service planned to begin by late spring, 2023. 

The railroad changed names from the Adirondack Scenic Railroad to the Adirondack Railroad in 2020.

Gallery

See also
List of heritage railways
New York Central Railroad Adirondack Division Historic District

Notes

References

External links

Adirondack Railroad website
Adirondack Rail Trail website
Wikimapia - Saranac Lake to Lake Placid
Wikimapia - Thendara to Utica

Heritage railroads in New York (state)
Tourist attractions in Essex County, New York
Tourist attractions in Franklin County, New York
Tourist attractions in Herkimer County, New York
Tourist attractions in Oneida County, New York
Transportation in Essex County, New York
Transportation in Franklin County, New York
Transportation in Herkimer County, New York
Transportation in Oneida County, New York
Adirondack Park
Saranac Lake, New York